Ilex myrtifolia, the myrtle dahoon or myrtle-leaved holly, is a species of holly native to the Southeastern United States.

References

myrtifolia
Trees of the Southeastern United States